Freedom of the press refers to legal protections for public communications media.

Free Press may also refer to:

Publications
Free Press (CPBF), the journal of the Campaign for Press and Broadcasting Freedom
The Free Press Journal, an Indian daily newspaper
Columbus Free Press, a former monthly "alternative" journal published in Columbus, Ohio, now published as Free Press newspaper, Free Press Express broadsheet and on the website freepress.org
Detroit Free Press, a daily newspaper
The Free Press (Mankato), a daily newspaper in Mankato, Minnesota
The Free Press (University of Southern Maine), a weekly student newspaper at the University of Southern Maine
The Free Press, a weekly newspaper published by The North Central Review Pty Ltd
Free Press (magazine), a short-lived magazine in the Malayalam language
Hong Kong Free Press
Montana Free Press
New Hampshire Free Press, a blog and bimonthly newspaper by Free State Project activists
The London Free Press, a daily newspaper based in London, Ontario, Canada
Los Angeles Free Press, an underground newspaper
Free Press (Scotland), which merged with the Aberdeen Journal in 1922 to become The Aberdeen Press and Journal
Syrian Free Press, an electronic newspaper about Syrian events
Winnipeg Free Press, a daily newspaper

Other
 Free Press (organization), a USA media advocacy organization founded by professor Robert W. McChesney and journalist John Nichols
 Free Press (publisher), an imprint of Simon & Schuster publishing
 The Free Press (media company), previously known as Common Sense, a media company founded by Bari Weiss
 House of the Free Press, a building in Bucharest, Romania
 The Free Press, Cambridge, a pub in Cambridgeshire, England

Lists of newspapers